The Variants is an American web series comedy about four employees who work in comic retail. This scripted comedy has completed 28 episodes comprising three seasons. The Variants aired its first episode August 4, 2009 and wrapped season one in May 2010. Its second season began May 3 of 2011 and completed in February 2012. The Variants completed a successful Kickstarter campaign on May 29, 2012 to fund a season three. A promo teaser was released on August 8, 2012 to Comics Alliance in advance of the new season. Season three launched weekly on September 3, 2012. The show is filmed on location at Zeus Comics in Dallas Texas.

While the series is available free on YouTube, Season One of The Variants was compiled on DVD in June 2011.

Plot
Richard and his employees handle the ins and outs of a struggling comic shop and its particular customers. While working retail in a unique market may offer bizarre situations, the employees have to work out a way to keep the store open through sales gimmicks and comic book artist signings.

Awards
The Variants received a Dallas Observer "Best of" award for its Dallas based production.

Reviews and Criticisms
Early criticism of The Variants include comparisons to Kevin Smith and his film Clerks. However reviewers have called The Variants "a sharply written and produced series" and noted positively the Variants strong LGBT and female characters in a medium dominated by men.

Guest Stars
Notable comic celebrity guest stars have include cartoonist Scott Kurtz of PVPonline, artist Dave Crosland, artist and creator of the Crow James O'Barr, artist Ben Templesmith, writer Mark Waid (as Richard's brother William), R. K. Milholland and Curt Franklin and Chris Haley of the Let's Be Friends Again web comic.

Cast
Joe Cucinotti as himself
Barry Fuhrman as himself
Ken Lowery as Vlad
Richard Neal as himself
Keli Wolfe as herself
Chris Haley as Terry
Curt Franklin as Svenus Jorgin

Episodes

Season 2

Season 3

References

External links 
 thevariants.com

2009 web series debuts
American comedy webcomics